Sardar Vallabhbhai Patel Stadium or Sardar Patel Stadium may refer to:

 Sardar Patel Stadium, an international cricket stadium in Motera, Ahmedabad
 Sardar Vallabhbhai Patel Stadium, Ahmedabad, a cricket stadium in Navrangpura, Ahmedabad
 Sardar Vallabhbhai Patel Stadium, Valsad, a cricket stadium in Valsad, Gujarat
 Sardar Vallabhbhai Patel Indoor Stadium, an indoor stadium in Mumbai, Maharashtra
 Sardar Vallabhbhai Patel International Hockey Stadium, a field hockey stadium in Raipur, Chhattisgarh
 Sardar Patel Cricket Stadium, a cricket stadium in Mehsana, Gujarat